The Dresden Files is a series of contemporary fantasy/mystery novels written by American author Jim Butcher. The first novel, Storm Front—which was also Butcher's writing debut—was published in 2000 by Roc Books.

The books are written as a first-person narrative from the perspective of private investigator and wizard Harry Dresden as he recounts investigations into supernatural disturbances in modern-day Chicago. Butcher's original proposed title for the first novel was Semiautomagic, which sums up the series' balance of fantasy and hard-boiled detective fiction.

As of 2021, Butcher has written 17 novels set in the Dresden Files universe, as well as a number of short stories (some of which are collected in the anthologies Side Jobs and Brief Cases; Others remain on his website). The series has also been released in audiobook format, narrated by James Marsters. Other works set in the same fictional universe include graphic novels (several new stories in addition to adaptations of the first two novels), and The Dresden Files Roleplaying Game. In 2007, a television series based on the novels aired for one season on the American Sci-Fi Channel.

Plot summary
In the world of The Dresden Files, magic is real—alongside vampires, demons, spirits, faeries, werewolves, outsiders and other monsters—while the both it and the supernatural are widely discredited. Additionally, large portions of the globe (such as much of Central and South America) are largely under the control of supernatural factions. These supernatural monsters are loosely countered by the White Council, an organization of human wizards noted to wield significant economic power in the world, along with their standing in the supernatural realm. Each species in the series (humans, faeries, vampires, etc.) has its own political and societal rules and organizations, acting as another counter on each-other and maintaining the masquerade. The human wizards depend on the White Council, while faeries mostly belong to either of two Faerie Courts, or none at all (Wyldfae). Vampires predominately belong to any of the four vampire courts. Other non-human creatures from a range of mythologies make appearances. 

Harry Dresden is the only advertising wizard in the United States, living in Chicago and investigating supernatural cases on behalf of both human and nonhuman clients. He also serves as a civilian consultant for the Special Investigations division of the Chicago Police Department, and is called upon at times to offer his opinion on cases that appear to have a magical element. As the series progresses, Dresden takes on an increasingly important role in the supernatural world at large, as he works to protect the general public, making getting by as a working wizard and private investigator difficult for him. He finds himself facing off against an increasing variety of creatures (including other wizards), while facing the realization that his various cases may all be tied together behind the scenes and that his role might be even greater than he is willing to admit.

Main characters 
 Harry Blackstone Copperfield Dresden is a detective and wizard. He works as a self-employed supernatural private investigator in Chicago, dealing with paranormal crimes and consulting for the Chicago Police Department.
 Bob is a "spirit of intellect" who inhabits a skull most often perched on a shelf in Harry Dresden's secret lab. He is bound to the skull and its owner's commands. He is free to leave the skull if given permission by his owner, but he will die if exposed to significant sunlight without a host body. His usual vessel is Harry's cat, Mister, who does not seem to mind Bob's presence.
 Karrin Murphy is  a Chicago Police Department officer who leads the Special Investigations (SI) division, handling cases in which something unexplainable or supernatural is involved.

Publication history
Jim Butcher decided to become a professional author at the age of 19. He wrote three novels within the fantasy genre, one of which he has classified as paranormal. He went on to describe all three books as being "terrible". In 1996 he enrolled in a writing class, where he was encouraged to write a novel similar to the Anita Blake: Vampire Hunter series by Laurell K. Hamilton, rather than the more traditional high fantasy that had been his focus in the past, as Butcher had previously stated that he enjoyed the Anita Blake series. Despite initial resistance, he wrote the first book that semester, closely following the instructions of his teacher, author Deborah Chester.

The result was Semiautomagic, later to be retitled as Storm Front. His writing teacher declared it to be publishable, and Butcher started looking around to do just that. Butcher failed to secure a publisher for two to three years. During this period  he completed the second novel, Fool Moon, and had made significant progress on the third, Grave Peril. Deciding to focus on agents and editors who had already published similar novels, Butcher submitted a copy of his manuscript to Ricia Mainhardt, the agent representing Laurell Hamilton. It was not accepted. Finally, Butcher met Hamilton at a convention and was invited to lunch along with Mainhardt and a second agent, Jennifer Jackson. Mainhardt agreed to represent him, and six months later The Dresden Files was sold to ROC, an imprint of Penguin Books.

The first volume, Storm Front, was released in 2000 in paperback; the next two novels in the series, Fool Moon and Grave Peril, were released shortly thereafter, in January and September 2001, also in paperback. Subsequent novels in the series have been published annually since then up to Skin Game, published in May 2014, followed by a six-year hiatus prior to the release of Peace Talks. Omnibus editions have been released by the Science Fiction Book Club, with each of the four volumes reprinting two or three of the novels in the sequence.

The series' first six novels were originally only published as paperbacks, but in 2007, ROC changed its strategy and began to publish hardcover reprints of books one to six. Volume six, Blood Rites, was released in July 2007. Each of the seventh through fifteenth volumes (Dead Beat through Skin Game) was published first as a hardcover and then released in paperback form several months later. The sixteenth and seventeenth volumes (Peace Talks and Battle Ground) were released simultaneously in both formats on their respective sale dates.

Orbit Books purchased the series for UK publication and released the first novel, Storm Front, in September 2005, five years after the initial US release. They then proceeded to publish two books per month. In November 2007, Orbit Books purchased the rights to Changes, the 12th novel, as well as the 13th Dresden novel, Ghost Story.

All 17 volumes of The Dresden Files, along with the companion short-story anthologies Side Jobs and Brief Cases, have been released as audiobooks.  Originally, all except Ghost Story have been narrated by James Marsters. Per a release on Jim Butcher's website on June 27, 2011, he reported that, "due to scheduling conflicts",  Marsters would be unable to voice Ghost Story; instead, the narration was performed by John Glover. James Marsters returned to read the Cold Days audio book. In April 2015, a rerecorded version of "Ghost Story" read by Marsters was released. The cover art for the series was created by Chris McGrath.

Skin Game, the 15th installment in the series, was a finalist for the 2015 Hugo Award for Best Novel.  Skin Game was proposed as a nominee by both fantasy writer Brad Torgersen's "Sad Puppies" and science fiction and fantasy author Theodore Beale's "Rabid Puppies" slates; both "Puppy" slates engendered some controversy in the science-fiction and fantasy community, since slate voting had not previously been a part of the Hugos. The book placed fifth in the final tally of the votes, behind "No Award".

While the cover art of each book portrays Dresden wearing a hat, in the novels themselves, he almost never does. This has become an in-joke between author, publisher and artist.  In Changes, when his Godmother attempts to equip him with an armored helmet, he explicitly says "I don't do hats".

Bibliography

All the books are published by ROC, an imprint of Penguin Books. The Science Fiction Book Club (SFBC) reissued the first nine books in hardcover omnibus editions.

The first four audiobook versions are produced by Buzzy Multimedia Publishing, while the fifth Death Masks and following were all produced by Penguin Audio. Proven Guilty and White Night were released in April 2009 alongside Turn Coat. Death Masks was released in November 2009, and Blood Rites and Dead Beat were released in April 2010. Skin Game was released in May 2014.

The next novel, Peace Talks, was released in July 2020. The release was scheduled to coincide with the twentieth anniversary of Storm Front. The following book, titled Battle Ground, was released on September 29 the same year. Both books were released as planned.

The 18th and 19th novels, Twelve Months and Mirror Mirror, are set to be published after The Olympian Affair (the second book in "Cinder Spires" series).

Butcher is currently planning for twenty-two books in the "case files" of the series, to be capped by a further "big apocalyptic trilogy".

Other media

Television

Debuting on January 21, 2007, the Sci Fi Channel TV adaptation starred Paul Blackthorne as the eponymous wizard. Harry's history in the series differed from that of the novels in several significant ways; his father, Malcolm Dresden, did not die from an aneurysm, but was instead murdered by Justin (named Morningway rather than DuMorne, and Harry's biological uncle). Bob is the spirit of a medieval wizard who, in punishment for using black magic to resurrect his life's love, is doomed to spend eternity inside his skull; he can manifest a human appearance outside the skull but only within a short radius of the skull itself–and must return to the skull when ordered. In "What About Bob?", it is revealed that he was also Dresden's primary magical teacher as a child.

Harry wears a magical "shield-bracelet" (and he also has the pentacle necklace, which makes an appearance in flashback scenes from "Bad Blood") that once belonged to his mother, and was given to him by his father. As a private investigator, Harry drives a Korean-War-era military Jeep instead of the infamous "Blue Beetle" VW Beetle of the novels (a change made based on actor Blackthorne's height and the difficulty of filming inside a VW Beetle, as well as the fact it would look more like a 'clown car' on video than a serious vehicle).

According to "Bad Blood", Harry was around 31 when he killed Justin, instead of 16 as in the novels; a Red Court vampire, Bianca, protected Harry while the High Council investigated Morningway's death. The two had a sexual relationship that does not exist in the books.

In the episode "What About Bob?", the events surrounding Justin's death at Dresden's hands are fully revealed: only five years prior to the series Dresden discovered that Justin, using black magic, was responsible for the death of his father. Justin said that he did not kill Harry's mother, but he died before the truth could be divined. Dresden used thaumaturgy—in this case, a voodoo doll of sorts—to attack Justin, who fought back using his own magical ability. In the scuffle, Harry accidentally crushed the voodoo doll, causing Justin to die with a "circle-shaped crushing wound" around his heart.

The series was canceled by the SciFi Channel in August 2007, despite a fan-led effort to bring the show back or find it a new home.

In October 2018, Fox 21 optioned the Dresden Files for a new TV series.

Graphic novels
Jim Butcher and Dabel Brothers produced a Dresden Files graphic novel series:

Working together with Dabel Brothers Productions, the Dresden Files are going to be translated into a graphic novel format. The current plan is to lay out the Dresden Files storyline at the rate of one of the novels every twelve to sixteen monthly issues, with occasional side-trips and independent stories thrown in. Ever wonder what happened in Branson the month before Storm Front? How about what somebody saw in the lake in Minnesota between Storm Front and Fool Moon? Maybe I’ll get to tell those stories now! How cool is that?

I will be assisting with the writing of the comics, and am also involved in the design and approval of the characters, art, tone, and so on. This is an actual hand-in-hand project in which I have full creative input and influence, and I'm friggin’ giddy about it. I mean, come on! Comic books!

The four-issue miniseries called Welcome to the Jungle, ran as a prequel to Storm Front from early to mid-2008. A compilation of that run was released as a hardcover graphic novel in October. Storm Front was announced as the next adaptation, by the same creative team. The first issue was released in November the same year. Welcome to the Jungle was nominated for the first Hugo Award for Best Graphic Story.

Midway through the production of Storm Front, the title changed hands from Dabel Brothers to Dynamite Entertainment, causing a long gap between issues #5 and #6. Artist Ardian Syaf left the project to work for DC, and Brett Booth was brought in to finish the graphic novel. Issue #6 was slated for May 2010.

In 2017, a Dresden Files miniseries called Wild Card won the Dragon Award for Best Graphic Novel, and another Dresden Files miniseries called Dog Men won the Dragon Award for Best Comic Book.

Roleplaying game

Jim Butcher has spoken openly about a pen and paper roleplaying game released in 2010 based on the Dresden Files universe. The game has been produced by Evil Hat Productions.

In January 2008, the project went into an early alpha phase of testing, and was in various beta testing phases throughout 2009. Pre-orders were opened up on April 4, 2010, and include immediate access to the pre-print PDF, dubbed the "Early Bird" version. Evil Hat released the game on June 23–27, to coincide with Origins 2010. The RPG currently consists of three books, Volume One: Your Story, the core rule book, Volume Two: Our World, a text describing the game universe, and Volume Three: Paranet Papers, expanding both the rules (including minor revisions) and the game universe (in particular, the DF version of Las Vegas). The game, which uses a modified version of the FATE system, emphasizes narrative structure over simulation of magical physics. It allows players to play a wide variety of characters, ranging from an ordinary human such as Karrin Murphy or Gentleman Johnny Marcone to magic users like Harry Dresden or Molly Carpenter to powerful supernatural creatures along the lines of Thomas Raith, all in the same game, with all the players able to make a contribution. On release it won awards at the Origins Awards, the Golden Geek Awards, and the ENnies.

In 2017, Evil Hat released Dresden Files Accelerated, a new standalone RPG based on Fate Accelerated Edition.

Evil Hat was working on a live-action version of the RPG, named "Dresden Lives", but was cancelled during beta testing.

Tabletop game 
In June 2017, Evil Hat Productions released a cooperative card game for 1–5 players designed by Eric B. Vogel, titled "The Dresden Files Cooperative Card Game" after a successful Kickstarter campaign, where they raised $549,486 from an initial goal of $48,000. The card game involves Harry Dresden and his friends on cases from the bestselling Dresden Files novels in the what-if scenario, for example if Harry was on the scene with allies who were not present in the original story. The core game includes Harry, Murphy, Susan, Michael, and the Alphas and plays through the first five novels as well as Side Jobs, a random scenario generator based on the short story collection of the same name. The art for the game is not screen grabs from the TV show, but is instead original artwork by Fred Hicks, Chris McGrath, and Tyler Walpole. The game was fairly well received, with a rating of 7.2 out of 10 on Board Game Geek's site. The rating system is based on user ratings, with a minimum number of votes required, and is subject to change, although drastic change is uncommon.  Three expansions for this game were released along with the base game in 2017, and two more were released the following year.

Influence
In the novel Fated, the first Alex Verus book by Benedict Jacka, Verus comments, "I've even heard of one guy in Chicago who advertises in the phone book under 'Wizard', though that's probably an urban legend".

In Ben Aaronovitch's book Broken Homes from the Rivers of London series, PC Peter Grant drinks a beer from a Chicago Brewery called "Mac's".

In Charles Stross's The Laundry Files novel The Rhesus Chart, one of the code words used is DRESDEN RICE, in reference to The Dresden Files and Anne Rice. In the novel The Fuller Memorandum, the protagonist is reading "a novel about a private magician for hire in Chicago".

In Larry Correia's The Adventures of Tom Stranger, Interdimensional Insurance Agent, the narration states of the titular protagonist: "Tom Stranger never thought of himself as a hero. Hero was a title saved for real men of courage, like George Washington or Harry Dresden".

References

External links
 The Dresden Files Series at Jim Butcher's website
 Buzzy Multimedia—Publishers of the audio books
 Dresden Lives official website

 
Book series introduced in 2000
American fantasy novel series
Contemporary fantasy novels
Novel series
Novels set in Chicago
Occult detective fiction
Urban fantasy novels
Wizards in fiction